Christopher J. Hodgkins (born August 24, 1957 in Tucson, Arizona) is an American politician who represented the 4th Berkshire District in the Massachusetts House of Representatives from 1983–2003. In 2006 he was a candidate for Massachusetts Senate in the Berkshire, Hampshire & Franklin District, but lost the Democratic primary to Benjamin Downing.

References

1957 births
Berkshire Community College alumni
Democratic Party members of the Massachusetts House of Representatives
People from Lee, Massachusetts
Politicians from Tucson, Arizona
University of Massachusetts Amherst alumni
Living people